The Castlemartin Training Area is located within the Pembrokeshire Coast National Park at Castlemartin, Pembrokeshire, Wales.  It is owned by the Ministry of Defence (MoD) and covers 

History

The Castlemartin Training Area was established in 1938 from both deserted and inhabited farmland, and from parts of the defunct Cawdor Estate. The ranges were abandoned by the military soon after the Second World War, but were re-instated in 1951 when the Korean War started. In 1961 there was a shortage of suitable tank training areas in the northern part of Germany for the then recently reactivated German Tank Units. The British Army of the Rhine (BAOR) extensively used the ranges at the Bergen-Hohne Training Area which totalled  as their training demands could not be met by the limited acreage available in the United Kingdom. Therefore, a NATO accordance was agreed in Paris whereby the fledgling German forces could use the  range at Castlemartin. This relationship between the German Armoured Units and Castlemartin lasted until October 1996, when after Germany reunification, additional ranges in eastern Germany became available.

Defence Training Estate

In 1999 the Defence Training Estate was formed and units from all over the UK and NATO have trained on the ranges. 
Within the Pembrokeshire Estate are:
 Castlemartin is one of two armoured fighting vehicle ranges in the UK with direct live firing gunnery exercises and armoured vehicle manoeuvres. The other is Lulworth Cove. Castlemartin is the only Defence Training Area normally available for armoured units to fire live rounds on land and littoral environments including live firing into the sea.
 Royal Artillery Range Manorbier, Penally Training Camp and Templeton Airfield - air defence systems,
 The Pembrokeshire Coast Path, part of the Wales Coast Path, has to avoid the range and in 2011, the MoD created a diversionary route which was safer for walkers by protecting them from having to negotiate the narrow country roads with fast-moving traffic.

Incidents
In May 2012, Ranger Michael Maguire from the 1st Battalion, The Royal Irish Regiment died in a live fire incident on the range. Ranger Maguire was resting in a safe area where he had removed his body armour and helmet when a stray round entered his temple. The machine gun fire that was responsible for his death also put civilians at risk on neighbouring beaches although there was no report of injuries. Ranger Maguire and his unit were training for deployment to Afghanistan.

On 14 June 2017 two Royal Tank Regiment soldiers were killed in an incident that involved the failure of a tank's main armament, due to the incomplete fitting of all parts that were required.
This led to hot gases being discharged that then ignited weapon charges that had been removed from their storage. The explosion and fire that occurred caused the injuries to all four of the crew, with two crew being fatally injured.

On 4 March 2021, Sergeant Gavin Hillier of 1st Battalion, Welsh Guards died during a live firing exercise.

Notes

References

External links

Location details and access opportunities and restrictions for Castlemartin range in South Pembrokeshire.
The Castlemartin RAC Range Bylaws 1986  S.I. 1986/1834

Training establishments of the British Army
Sites of Special Scientific Interest in Pembrokeshire
Military installations in Wales
Installations of the British Army
1938 establishments in Wales
Military installations established in 1938